The beige catshark (Parmaturus bigus) is a cat shark of the family Scyliorhinidae, The first recorded specimen was a female recorded off the coast of Queensland, Australia around Lord Howe Island. Its length was 72 cm.

Recently, a number of both male and female specimens (unpublished data) were captured in the waters off New Zealand, at the edge of the EEZ (exclusive economic zone). To date, very little is known about the ecology of this species. Scientists are currently studying the sensory systems of this catshark in order to reveal information about its ecology and ultimately behaviour. The reproduction of the beige catshark is oviparous.

References

 Compagno, Dando, & Fowler, Sharks, Collins Gem, HarperCollins, London 2006 

beige catshark
Fauna of Queensland
Marine fish of Eastern Australia
beige catshark